The following is a list of phosphodiesterase inhibitors.

List
 Adibendan
 Aminophylline
 Aminophylline dihydrate
 Amipizone
 Apremilast
 Arofylline
 Atizoram
 Befuraline
 Bemarinone hydrochloride
 Bemoradan
 Benafentrine
 Bucladesine
 Buflomedil
 Buquineran
 CC-1088
 Carbazeran
 Catramilast
 Cilomilast
 Cilostamide
 Cilostazol
 Cipamfylline
 Crisaborole
 Daxalipram
 Denbufylline
 Dimabefylline
 Diniprofylline
 Dipyridamole
 Doxofylline
 Drotaverine
 Dyphylline
 Enoximone
 Etamiphyllin
 Etofylline
 Filaminast
 Flufylline
 Fluprofylline
 Furafylline
 Imazodan
 Imazodan hydrochloride
 Inamrinone
 Inamrinone lactate
 Isbufylline
 Lirimilast
 Lisofylline
 Lomifylline
 Medorinone
 Metescufylline
 Midaxifylline
 Milrinone
 Milrinone lactate
 Motapizone
 Nanterinone
 Nestifylline
 Nitraquazone
 Oglemilast
 Oglemilast Sodium
 Olprinone
 Oxagrelate
 Oxtriphylline
 Papaverine
 Papaverine hydrochloride
 Papaverine sulfate
 Parogrelil
 Pelrinone hydrochloride
 Pentifylline
 Pentoxifylline
 Perbufylline
 Piclamilast
 Pimefylline
 Pimobendan
 Piroximone
 Prinoxodan
 Proxyphylline
 Pumafentrine
 Quazinone
 Quazodine
 Revamilast
 Revizinone
 Roflumilast
 Rolipram
 Ronomilast
 Saterinone
 Senazodan
 Siguazodan
 Tetomilast
 Tofimilast
 Trapidil
 Vesnarinone
 Zardaverine

cGMP phosphodiesterase inhibitors
 Aminotadalafil
 Avanafil
 Beminafil
 Dasantafil
 Gisadenafil
 Gisadenafil besylate
 Mirodenafil
 Sildenafil
 Sildenafil citrate
 Tadalafil
 Udenafil
 Vardenafil
 Vardenafil dihydrochloride
 Vardenafil hydrochloride trihydrate
 Zaprinast

See also
 Phosphodiesterase inhibitor

Sources
 This list was created from the NCI Thesaurus.

Phosphodiesterase inhibitors